Angela Hunte-Wisner, known by the stage name Angela Hunte, is an American-Trinidadian singer-songwriter, and producer. She is best known for being a contributing writer for Empire State of Mind, with Alicia Keys and Jay Z, a song which won her a Grammy. She has collaborated with several international acts and is currently working on her debut album, citing influences from such artists as Phil Collins, Shirley Bassey, Sting, David Bowie, Machel Montano and Sparrow, a Trinidadian Calypsonian.

She is also a former member of the 1990s girl group 7669.

Personal life
Hunte was born in Brooklyn, New York and raised in Barataria, Trinidad and Tobago where her family originated. She was the only child of her parents to be born in the United States. Shortly after her birth, the family returned to Trinidad and Tobago where she was raised.

In the early 90s, Hunte was part of the short-lived Motown Records quartet 7669. They released one studio album - 1993's 7669 East from a Bad Block.

She is married to Sound Engineer/Mix Engineer and Grammy Award winner James Wisner and has two children, King Zion Wisner, and Brooklyn Rose Wisner.

Career

Early work
Hunte began working as a writer, starting with Rap hooks and vocals. Later she began collaborating with Salaam Remi, a producer, who mentored her and developed her talents as a Singer-songwriter.

She then became an exclusive writer with EMI Management, attached to Europe, a contract that was brought to fruition by Salaam Remi. After a stint writing in Europe and London specifically, she returned to New York and began working on several international collaborations across several genres of music.

Notable collaborations 
During her tenure Hunte has written for and or performed with the following:

 Empire State of Mind - Jay Z feat Alicia Keys
 I Need Air - Magnetic Man feat Angela Hunte
 Do Somethin' - Britney Spears
 I Can - Nas feat Angela Hunte
 Heartbreaker; Show Stopper - Danity Kane
 Bang Bang - Melanie Fiona
 Hold Up - P Diddy feat Angela Hunte
 Tip Pon Toe - Rihanna
 Bboy - Mutya Buena feat Amy Winehouse
 True Confessions - Lisa "Left Eye" Lopes feat Angela Hunte
 Feels Good - David Morales feat Angela Hunte
 Here Comes the King - Snoop Lion feat Angela Hunte
 Ashtrays and Heartbreaks -Snoop Lion feat Miley Cyrus
 Torn Apart - Snoop Lion feat Rita Ora
 No Guns Allowed - Snoop Lion feat Drake
 Smoke the Weed - Snoop Lion feat Collie Buddz
 Remedy - Snoop Lion feat Chris Brown and Busta Rhymes
 No Regrets - Snoop Lion feat TI and Amber Coffman
 So Long - Snoop Lion feat Angela Hunte
 Get Away - Snoop Lion feat Angela Hunte and Elan Atias
 Vixen - Gyptian feat Angela Hunte
 Be Alright - Gyptian
 Sex, Love and Reggae - Gyptian feat Angela Hunte and Bunji Garlin
 Good Girls - Gyptian 
 Soundboy Kill It - Raekwon feat Melanie Fiona and Assassin
 Call of Duty - Raekwon feat Akon
 Do It Again; Do What I Love - Melissa Ethridge
 One Shot - Angela Hunte
 Party Done! - Angela Hunte & Machel Montano
 One Bright Day - Slightly Stoopid feat Angela Hunte
 Mona June - Slightly Stoopid Feat Angela Hunte
 Like So - Machel Montano feat. Angela Hunte
 Citrus Skies - Tunnel Vision feat. Angela Hunte
  Welcome to America - Black Thought feat. C. S. Armstrong & Angela Hunte

Awards and nominations
Empire State of Mind, by Jay Z featuring Alicia Keys, was co-written by Angela Hunte. In 2010 it was nominated for three Grammy Awards, including Grammy Award for Record of the Year and winning Best Rap Song and Best Rap/Sung Collaboration

Studio album
 7669 East from a Bad Block (with 7669) (Motown, 1993)

References

External links

 Official Facebook Page
 
  Angela on Billboard

20th-century American singers
20th-century American women singers
21st-century American singers
American people of Trinidad and Tobago descent
American women rappers
Grammy Award winners
Living people
Rappers from Brooklyn
Songwriters from New York (state)
Year of birth missing (living people)
21st-century American rappers
21st-century American women singers
21st-century women rappers